William Joseph Cardoso (September 24, 1937 - February 26, 2006) was an American journalist who was known for coining the term "gonzo journalism".

Cardoso was born in Cambridge, Massachusetts and raised in Somerville, Massachusetts. He was the youngest of three brothers and had one daughter, Linda Cardoso.

He studied journalism at Boston University and in 1967 he joined The Boston Globe and shortly thereafter became editor of the Globe Sunday magazine. He eventually settled in California.
While not as well known as his literary friends, he wrote for many publications in the 1960s and 1970s such as Crawdaddy!, Harper's Weekly, New Times,
Ramparts, and Rolling Stone. He was also a good friend of Hunter S. Thompson and was present for the legendary Rumble in the Jungle.

His work was collected in a 1984 volume called The Maltese Sangweech and Other Heroes. He also fondly shared his memories of Hunter S. Thompson with E. Jean Carroll for her 1993 biography, Hunter.

Cardoso died of heart failure in the early morning of February 26, 2006, at his home in Kelseyville, California, aged 68.

References

External links 
 Bill Cardoso -- journalist who coined the word 'Gonzo'
 Bill Cardoso

1937 births
2006 deaths
Boston University College of Communication alumni
Writers from Cambridge, Massachusetts
20th-century American journalists
American male journalists